The 1895–96 Yale Bulldogs men's basketball team represented Yale University in intercollegiate basketball during the 1895–96 season. The team finished the season with an 8–5 record and was retroactively named the national champion by the Premo-Porretta Power Poll.

Schedule and results

|-
!colspan=9 style=| Regular season

References

Yale Bulldogs men's basketball seasons
Yale
NCAA Division I men's basketball tournament championship seasons
Yale Bulldogs Men's Basketball Team
Yale Bulldogs Men's Basketball Team